The Panoptikum Hamburg is a wax museum in Hamburg, Germany. Founded in 1879 by Friedrich Hermann Faerber, it is the country's oldest wax museum. Each wax figure takes up to two years and €40,000 to complete. According to its owners, the Panoptikum receives around 200,000 visitors annually as of 2018.

References

Wax museums
Museums in Hamburg
Museums established in 1879
1879 establishments in Germany